Albina Khabibulina (born 11 May 1992) is a former professional tennis player and member of the Uzbekistan Fed Cup team. She is of Tatar descent.

On 4 July 2011, she reached her highest WTA singles ranking of 492, whilst her best doubles ranking was 208 on 4 August 2014.

Playing for the Uzbekistan Fed Cup team, Khabibulina has a win-loss record of 11–13.

As of November 2019, Khabibulina has been provisionally suspended by the Tennis Integrity Unit.

ITF Circuit finals

Singles: 7 (1 title, 6 runner-ups)

Doubles: 51 (31–20)

References

External links
 
 
 
 

Medalists at the 2006 Asian Games
1992 births
Living people
Uzbekistani female tennis players
Tatar sportspeople
Tennis players at the 2010 Asian Games
Asian Games medalists in tennis
Tennis players at the 2006 Asian Games
Asian Games bronze medalists for Uzbekistan
Match fixing in tennis